São João das Duas Pontes is a municipality in the state of São Paulo in Brazil. The population is 2,561 (2020 est.) in an area of 129 km². The elevation is 427 m.

References

Municipalities in São Paulo (state)